was a woman from the Sengoku period to the Azuchi–Momoyama period. She was the second daughter of Mōri Motonari, and the wife of Shishido Takaie.

Life
In 1529, Lady Goryū was born in Tajihi-Sarugake Castle, the second daughter of Mōri Motonari, daimyō of the Chūgoku region. Her mother was Motonari's wife, Myōkyū. She was the younger sister of Mōri Takamoto and the older sister of Kikkawa Motoharu. Takamoto had an older sister, but in infancy, she was adopted by the Takahashi clan (as a hostage) and later killed following their demise. Lady Goryū was loved by her parents.

In 1534, she married Shishido Takaie, the head of the Shishido clan in Aki Province.  Their marriage was part of the reconciliation between Shishido and Motonari.  In 1547, Takaie's eldest son, Shishido Motohide, was born. Among the children Lady Goryū had with him, her eldest daughter was married to Kōno Michinobu of Iyo Province, her second daughter married Motonaga (the eldest son of Kikkawa Motoharu), and her third daughter, Seikōin, married Mōri Terumoto; each marriage contributed to solidifying the unity of the Mōri family.  There seems to have been a terrible ambiance between Lady Goryū and Lady Shinjō, Motoharu's wife, according to Motonari's Sanshi Kyokunjo.

Lady Goryū died on August 2, 1574, at the age of 46. It is believed the cause of death was a stroke. Her posthumous Buddhist name is Hōkōinden Eishitsu Myōjudaishi (法光院殿栄室妙寿大姉). The location of her grave is unknown, although there are four possible locations – two in Kōdachō Asatsuka, Akitakata, Hiroshima, one in Kōdachō Sukumoji, Akitakata, Hiroshima, and one in Ibara Shirakicho, Asakita-ku, Hiroshima. Takaie was buried along with his second wife.

In popular culture
Lady Goryū is portrayed in the 1997 NHK Taiga drama Mōri Motonari as "Eno". She is portrayed by Takahashi Yumiko, and her younger incarnation is portrayed by Itō Asuka.

References

1574 deaths
16th-century Japanese women
People of Sengoku-period Japan
Mōri clan
1529 births